Something to Talk About is a 1995 American comedy-drama film directed by Lasse Hallström, from a screenplay written by Callie Khouri. It stars Julia Roberts and Dennis Quaid as an estranged couple, Kyra Sedgwick as Roberts' sister, and Robert Duvall and Gena Rowlands as their parents.

The film's title stems from the Bonnie Raitt song of the same name. It was shot in various locations around Savannah, Georgia and Beaufort, South Carolina.

Plot
Grace discovers that her husband, Eddie, is having an affair with another woman. After a wildly public confrontation with Eddie and his mistress, Grace packs up their daughter and returns home to her parents' horse farm to regroup. To her surprise and dismay, everyone around her is still mired in old fashioned ideals and believes she should forgive and forget Eddie's indiscretion. Her sister, Emma Rae, who is furious at Eddie and lets him know it, is also unwilling to let Grace pretend this has come out of nowhere, or that she did not make choices that led to her current predicament. Eddie, too, confronts Grace about her withdrawal from their life, and his feelings of abandonment after what started out as an affectionate, loving marriage. Her father feels the whole affair is dragging focus from an upcoming horse-jumping competition, but he and Grace's mother, Georgia, face their own set of problems with fidelity.

Cast
 Julia Roberts as Grace King Bichon - wife of Eddie, mother of Caroline, youngest daughter of Wyly and Georgia and younger sister of Emma Rae.  She is very upset and devastated when she discovers her husband is cheating on her.
 Dennis Quaid as Eddie Bichon - husband of Grace, father of Caroline, son-in-law of Wyly and Georgia, and brother-in-law of Emma Rae; he cheats on Grace with a blond woman
 Robert Duvall as Wyly King - father of Grace and Emma Rae, husband of Georgia, father-in-law of Eddie, and maternal grandfather of Caroline; owns a horse farm.
 Kyra Sedgwick as Emma Rae King - oldest daughter of Wyly and Georgia, older sister of Grace, aunt of Caroline, and sister-in-law of Eddie. When she finds her brother-in-law Eddie is cheating on her sister Grace she kicks him in the balls to teach him a lesson.
 Gena Rowlands as Georgia King - wife of Wyly, mother of Grace and Emma Rae, maternal grandmother of Caroline, and mother-in-law of Eddie.
 Haley Aull as Caroline "Doodlebug" Bichon - daughter of Eddie and Grace, maternal granddaughter of Wyly and Georgia, and niece of Emma Rae.
 Brett Cullen as Jamie Johnson
 Muse Watson as Hank Corrigan

Reception
The film received mixed reviews. Review aggregator Rotten Tomatoes reports that 39% of critics, based on a sample of 28 critics, gave a positive review. The average rating from these critics is 5.6/10. The site's consensus states: "Small-town gossip and a battle of the sexes should really add up to more than Something to Talk About, especially with this much talent before the camera." On Metacritic — which assigns a weighted mean score — the film has a score of 62 out of 100 based on 28 critics, indicating "generally favorable reviews". Audiences polled by CinemaScore gave the film an average grade of "A-" on an A+ to F scale.

Awards
Kyra Sedgwick was nominated for a Golden Globe Award for Best Actress in a Supporting Role.

References

External links
 
 
 
 
 

1995 films
1990s English-language films
1990s romantic comedy-drama films
American romantic comedy-drama films
1990s feminist films
Films about adultery in the United States
Films about families
Films scored by Hans Zimmer
Films directed by Lasse Hallström
Films shot in South Carolina
Films shot in Savannah, Georgia
Warner Bros. films
1995 comedy films
1995 drama films
1990s American films